In the military, a line of departure or start line is the starting position for an attack on enemy positions.

Assault tactics